Mission to Mars is a 1955 children's science fiction novel by Patrick Moore, published by Burke. It is the first of a six-book series based on the character Maurice Gray.

The action is set initially on Earth and then on Mars. The time is 1968, two years after the first landing on the Moon.

Plot synopsis
Maurice Gray, a young recently orphaned Englishman, arrives at the Woomera Rocket base in Australia to meet his only known relative, Dr Leslie Yorke, a scientist at the base. He learns from Bruce Talbot, a radar technician, that Dr. Yorke is presently on an expedition to Mars in the Hermes.

Listening to the base radio, Maurice hears a fragmentary message from the expedition in morse code. The expedition report that their ship has landed, but has been damaged and is inoperable. They have limited supplies of air.

Because of his light weight and his knowledge of radio-transmission, Sir Robert Lanner, the Chief Controller, is persuaded to allow Maurice to join a rescue mission with Bruce and Dr David Mellor aboard the nuclear-powered ship Ares.

The journey is uneventful except for a spacewalk that goes wrong; Maurice rescues Bruce when the latter loses his safety line. This rescue binds the crew closer together.

During the landing, they pass through the so-called 'Violet Layer', a portion of the Martian atmosphere, which severely buffets them. They land, but their radar systems are damaged beyond repair. They discover that the Layer contains a powerful magnetic field, which also probably damaged the Hermes.

Exploring Mars on foot, Maurice and Bruce are nearly frozen in the cold of night when a dust-storm delays them and injures Bruce. They make fragmentary contact with Yorke, who reports a few hours worth of air. They set out to rescue the others.

On the journey, they encounter carnivorous gastropods and pterodactyl-like flying creatures. They witness an attack by one of the gastropods on one of the flying creatures and are able to rescue the latter, nicknaming it "Horace". Unable to find the Hermes, they are guided to the ship by "Horace" and several others, who exhibit signs of intelligence.

Yorke, Whitton and Knight are found, running critically short of air. They cannibalise the Hermes, especially the undamaged radar systems, and return to the Ares. Despite the extra weight, they manage to take off and return to Earth.

A fossil collected by one of the expedition members is examined and speculated to have been part of a winged intelligent humanoid - maybe one of the remote ancestors of "Horace".

Maurice, now fascinated by Mars, is invited to join the staff at Woomera.

See also

The Voices of Mars, 1957 book in the Maurice Gray series

References

1955 British novels
1955 science fiction novels
British science fiction novels
Children's science fiction novels
Space exploration novels
Novels set on Mars
Fiction set in 1968